Psalm 125 is the 125th psalm of the Book of Psalms, beginning in English in the King James Version: "They that trust in the  shall be as mount Zion". In Latin, it is known by as, " Qui confidunt in Domino". The Book of Psalms is part of the third section of the Hebrew Bible, and a book of the Christian Old Testament. Psalm 125 is one of fifteen psalms that begin with the words "A song of ascents" (Shir Hama'a lot).

In the slightly different numbering system used in the Greek Septuagint and the Latin Vulgate, this psalm is Psalm 124.

The psalm forms a regular part of Jewish, Catholic, Lutheran, Anglican and other Protestant liturgies.

Text

Hebrew Bible version 
Following is the Hebrew text of Psalm 125:

King James Version 
 They that trust in the LORD shall be as mount Zion, which cannot be removed, but abideth for ever.
 As the mountains are round about Jerusalem, so the LORD is round about his people from henceforth even for ever.
 For the rod of the wicked shall not rest upon the lot of the righteous; lest the righteous put forth their hands unto iniquity.
 Do good, O LORD, unto those that be good, and to them that are upright in their hearts.
 As for such as turn aside unto their crooked ways, the LORD shall lead them forth with the workers of iniquity: but peace shall be upon Israel.

Verse 5
As for such as turn aside to their crooked ways,
The Lord shall lead them away
With the workers of iniquity.
Peace be upon Israel!
For "crooked ways", the Vulgate has the words in obligationes, translated in the Douay-Rheims 1899 American Edition as "such as turn aside into bonds".

The concluding prayer for peace upon Israel recurs at the end of Psalm 128. It is best taken as a "detached clause", according to the Pulpit Commentary.

Uses

Judaism
This psalm is recited following Mincha between Sukkot and Shabbat Hagadol.

Catholic Church
Around 530, St. Benedict of Nursia used this for the office of Sext from Tuesday until Saturday, after Psalms 123 and 124, according to the Rule of St. Benedict. Today its use is in the Liturgy of the Hours, being recited or sung at vespers on Monday of the third week of the four weekly liturgical cycle.

References

External links 

 
 
 Text of Psalm 125 according to the 1928 Psalter
 Psalms Chapter 125 text in Hebrew and English, mechon-mamre.org
 A song of ascents. / Those trusting in the LORD are like Mount Zion text and footnotes, usccb.org United States Conference of Catholic Bishops
 Psalm 125:1 introduction and text, biblestudytools.com
 Psalm 125 – As the Mountains Surround Jerusalem enduringword.com
 Psalm 125 / Refrain: Glorious things are spoken of you, / Zion, city of our God. Church of England
 Psalm 125 at biblegateway.com
Hymnary.org, Hymns for Psalm 125

125